Finn Moestue Huseby (11 May 1905 – 2001) was a Norwegian priest. He graduated as cand.theol. in 1930. He worked as seamen's priest in New Orleans from 1931 to 1934, in Antwerp from 1935 to 1936, and in Hamburg from 1936 to 1942. He had to leave Germany because of a conflict with Nazi-friendly Norwegians in Germany, and assistant priest Arne Berge took over after him as the seamen's priest in Hamburg.  He was parish priest in Brandbu from 1946.

Huseby was decorated Knight First Class of the Royal Norwegian Order of St. Olav in 1945, for his work for prisoners in Germany during the Second World War.

References

1905 births
2001 deaths
People from Akershus
20th-century Norwegian Lutheran clergy
Norwegian people of World War II